SITE Town lies in the southern part of Karachi and was named after the Sindh Industrial & Trading Estate. SITE Town was formed in 2001 as part of The Local Government Ordinance 2001, and was subdivided into 9 union councils. The town system was disbanded in 2011, and SITE Town was re-organized as part of Karachi West District in 2015.

In 2020, Kemari District was carved out from Karachi West District. So SITE Town ended up being part of Kemari District.

Location 
SITE Town was located western part of Karachi, Pakistan and was named after the Sindh Industrial and Trading Estate (SITE) area. The town was bordered by Gadap Town to the north, Liaquatabad Town and North Nazimabad Town to the east across the Orangi Nala stream, Lyari Town and Saddar Town to the south across the Lyari River and Kiamari Town to the west. Also neighbouring the town were Baldia Town and Orangi Town to the northwest.

History

2000 
The federal government introduced local government reforms in the year 2000, which eliminated the previous "third tier of government" (administrative divisions) and replaced it with the fourth tier (districts). The effect in Karachi was the dissolution of the former Karachi Division in 2001, and the merging of its five districts to form a new Karachi City-District with eighteen autonomous constituent towns including SITE Town.

2011 
In 2011, the system was disbanded but remained in place for bureaucratic administration until 2015, when the Karachi Metropolitan Corporation system was reintroduced.

2015 
In 2015, SITE Town was re-organized as part of Karachi West district

Neighborhoods

 Banaras Colony
 Bhawani Chali
 Chittagong Colony
 Frontier Colony
 Haroonabad
 Islamia Colony
 Jahanabad
 Golimar
 Metroville
 Old Golimar
 Pak Colony
 Qasba Colony
 Pathan Colony
 Mastan Chali
 Qaim Khani

See also
 Karachi Local Government
 SITE Industrial Area
 Sindh Industrial and Trading Estate

References

External links
 Karachi Metropolitan Corporation official website
 Al Momin educational & welfare society (located within SITE Town)

 
Towns in Karachi
Keamari District